Club Atlético Zacatepec was a Mexican football team based in Zacatepec, Morelos. They are nicknamed Cañeros (sugarcane growers). Their colors are white and green (from sugar and sugarcane, respectively). Their uniform color is a white shirt with a big green line in the middle and white shorts and socks. Their greatest achievements were in the 1950s when Zacatepec won two titles in Primera División. They won their first league title in the 1954–1955 season and their second title in the 1957–1958 season. Zacatepec won the Copa Mexico championship in the 1958–1959 season.

The head coach of Zacatepec during the 1950s was Ignacio Trelles, a former professional Mexican football player who became head coach of the Mexico national team in the 1962 FIFA World Cup in Chile and 1966 FIFA World Cup in England.

History

The club dates back to the early 1920s and was formed by local farmers and co-op members that operated the local sugar mill.

It was not until 1948 when Rodrigo Ampudia del Valle along with the sugar mill's coop membership, including the mill's superintendent and its chief chemist Gustavo de la Parra, founded Club Social y Deportivo  Zacatepec who from its foundation sought to play in the professional division. A few years later the club would go on to win important things in the national level and international level.

It was in 1951 when  future manager Ignacio Trelles took over the club. In the 1951 second division final they won, earning a promotion to the Primera División de México, taking over the spot left by Club San Sebastián de León who would never again return to the top division.

The club finished runner-up in 1953. In 1955, the club won its first league title, becoming the first club in the state of Morelos to achieve that, Which made the locals celebrate in the streets thing that had no been seen before. The following year the club won the 1956–57 Copa Mexico against León for the first time.

The club won the 1957 league title just ahead of Toluca once ageing under the care of Ignacio Trelles who would go on to win titles with other clubs in the league becoming one of the best managers in the league history. The following tournament the club finished third, 4 points behind runner-up León and 6 points behind Guadalajara who would go on to win the next 6 out of 7 titles from 1958 to 1965. The club would also go on to lose the 1957–58 Copa Mexico to León.

In the following years the club struggled, finishing 10th in 1959–60 and 6th in 1960–61, and it was finally in 1961 when the club played its worst tournament, finishing last and being relegated to the second division

That club from the 1950s is still remembered as one of the best in the club's history. The club played some importation international friendlies in the 1950s against some of the best clubs from around the world. The club defeated Nacional who had won the Campeón Mundial de Clubes and would also go on to beat Manchester United in a friendly game.

The club started the 1960s playing the top division but after a bad league tournament in 1961 the club was relegated to the second division where after one year in the lower league the club was promoted after winning the 1962–63 tournament and was once again in the Primera División de México, taking over the spot left by Jaibos Tampico Madero. The club struggle in its first years back and it was in their third year when the club once again finished last in the competition and was relegated to the second division. The club allied in the second division from 1965 to 1970 when the club won its second second division title and earning the promotion along with Puebla who had one a promotional play-off series with four other clubs that year in order to increase the numbers of clubs in the league.

The club started the 1970s once again in the first division; in the 1970–71 tournament the club finished tied for second in Group Corsairs 5 points behind the group leader and league runner-up Toluca. In the 1971–72 tournament the club finished fifth in Group A 15 points behind leader and league champion Cruz Azul. In the 1972–73 tournament the club just barely avoided relegation and finished four points ahead of Pachuca. The club struggled the following year finish in eighth in group 8 Group A once again avoiding relegation. In the 1974–75 tournament the club's struggles continued once again finishing in the bottom five. In the 1975–76 the club once again avoided relegation finishing six points ahead of Atlante, who was relegated. It was finally in the 1976–77 tournament when the club could not avoid relegation after having a bad year, finishing with 27 points—fewest in the league.

It didn't take long for the club to return to the main stage after winning the 1977–78 second division title its third in its history. The club had a good year in the 1978–79 tournament qualifying to the play-off tournament, a short tournament where they finished last. In the 1979–80 the club once again qualify after finishing first in group 4 with 44 points but would again have a bad play-off tournament. And so the 1970s were over having the club struggles at the beginning of the decade and finishing with back-to-back play-off berths.

The club started the 1980s in the first division. In the 1980–81 tournament the club qualified to the playoff stage with 42 points by means of 17 wins, 8 draws, and 13 defeats. In the play-offs the club played out of group 1 where they finished second behind Cruz Azul who would go on to lose the final against the winner of group 2 Pumas UNAM. In the 1981–82 tournament the club once again qualified this time playing a series which they lost to Deportivo Neza 2–3 after two matches. In the 1982–83 tournament the club tied for the worst record in the league with Atletico Morelia both only earning 30 points on 38 games. A relegation match was held where after two matches Atletico Morelia managed to keep the category winning the series after a penalty shootout. The club would play for the fifth time in the second division but it would only take them one year to return winning the 1983-82 second division championship. After their 5th promotion the club would lose the category again in the 1984–85 tournament, being the last time the club played in the first division.

After bouncing between the second and third tiers of Mexican football during the 2000s, Zacatepec finally found stability in 2013 when it was announced that their home stadium would receive a multimillion-dollar renovation. After the 2017 Clausura season, Zacatepec owners decided to place the club in brief hiatus while the club would be restructured. Shortly after, franchise owner of Coras de Tepic Jose Luis Higuera received temporary permission to move his franchise to Zacatepec for the football year along with temporary use of naming rights.

Stadium
Agustín "Coruco" Díaz stadium is the home of Zacatepec. It was founded in November 1954. It was inaugurated by then president of Mexico Adolfo López Mateos. The stadium is nicknamed la selva cañera (the sugarcane jungle) due to Zacatepec's humid weather conditions.

Motto
Club Zacatepec's motto is "Hacer Deporte es Hacer Patria" which means doing sports is to be a patriot.

On 23 March 2013, Morelos governor announced the team would return to the Ascenso MX in August 2013, taking the place of Irapuato. Zacatepec was relegated after just 2 season in Ascenso MX, but bought Cruz Azul Hidalgo and will remain in the Ascenso MX for the Apertura 2014.

Past Crests

Past kits

Home 
 Home Kit white shirt with a green strip that runs across the chest with green shorts and white socks.
 Away Kit green shirt with a white strip that runs across the chest with white shorts and green socks.
 Third Kit  white shirt with green strip that runs across chest white shorts and white socks.

Away

Season to season

 Has played 27. 1st Division Tournaments last in 1985.
 Has played 22 2nd Division tournaments last in Clausura 2013.
 Has played 13 Primera A tournaments last in Clausura 2020
 Has played 8  3rd Division tournaments last in Clausura 2011.

Honours
Primera División
Champions: 1954–55, 1957–58
Runners-up: 1952–53

Copa Mexico
Winners: 1956–57, 1958–59
Runners-up: 1957–58, 1970–71

Campeón de Campeones
Winners: 1958

Ascenso MX
Runners-up: Verano 1998, Invierno 1999, Apertura 2019

Segunda División
Champions (5): 1950–51, 1962–63, 1969–70, 1977–78, 1983–84
Runners-up: 1968–69, 1991–92

Players

Managers
 Ignacio Trelles (1950–51), (1954–58)
 Guillermo Huerta (2013–2014)
 Adrián Martínez ''(Interim) (2014)
 Ignacio Rodríguez (2014–2015)
 Joel Sánchez (2015)
 Carlos Gutiérrez (2015–2017)
 Marcelo Michel Leaño (2017–2018)
 Alberto Clark (2018)
 Ricardo Valiño (2018–2020)

Footnotes

"Exclusiva: Cruz Azul Hidalgo Desaparece Para Convertirse En Zacatepec." Goal.com. 15 May 2014. Web. 17 May 2014.

 
Football clubs in Morelos
1948 establishments in Mexico
Ascenso MX teams
Liga MX teams
Association football clubs established in 1948